Mount Read is a mountain located in the West Coast region of Tasmania, Australia, and is at the north west edge of the West Coast Range.

Geology
The main copper and gold ore bearing deposits in the West Coast Range are known to occur in the Mount Read Volcanics relating to the complex geology of the area.

Mineralisation and deposits were being identified well beyond the life of the original mines utilised on Mount Read.

To the south east of Mount Read are many features of glaciation in the Tyndall Range as well as glacial lakes of Lake Westwood, Lake Selina, and Lake Julia.

Hercules Haulage

The Hercules Mine on Mount Read was connected by a  haulage incline to Williamsford and then to the North East Dundas Tramway.

The mine was in production in the late nineteenth century. It had a major strike in 1906. The mine produced well into the mid twentieth century. The mine site had ceased operation and was subject to cleanup processes in the early 2000s.

The Hercules Gold and Silver Mining Company was an operating company that ceased in 1916. The Mount Read and Rosebery Mines Limited started as an ex-Mount Lyell offshoot, absorbed by EZ by 1925.

Mount Read township
The community, mainly known in early sources as the Mount Read township surrounding the Hercules minesite had various struggles for services and facilities.
 Situated at 1000 metres Mount Read (township) was the most elevated town which has existed in Tasmania

Huon pine
Despite extensive historic mining and human activity on its slopes, Mount Read has unique and significant stands of Huon pine forests on its slopes. The southern slopes of Mount Read have been identified as a special habitat enclosed in the Lake Johnston Nature Reserve.

Climate
Mount Read has an alpine subpolar oceanic climate (Köppen climate classification: Cfc), bordering on a tundra climate (Köppen climate classification: ET). It currently has a Bureau of Meteorology automatic weather station in place, and it scores well in extreme weather conditions. Its extreme rainfall records for Autumn 2006 put it on a par with the Lake Margaret rainfall – which was still apparently recorded till 30 June 2006 by Hydro employees, but not appearing on the BOM website. It has one of the highest annual rain day amount in the world at 282 days, topping Cherrapunji in India, but falling behind Mount Waialeale in Hawaii and López de Micay in Colombia, which have 335 and 315 rainy days respectively. Its monthly temperature averages are comparable to those of Reykjavik in Iceland. Snowfalls are highly frequent and often very heavy, occurring at all times of the year. The mean afternoon relative humidity is the greatest anywhere in Australia, particularly in the cooler months.

See also

 List of highest mountains of Tasmania
 North East Dundas Tramway
 Montezuma Falls
 West Coast Tasmania Mines
 List of oldest trees

References

Further reading
 
 Pink, Kerry. The west coast story : a history of Western Tasmania and its mining fields Rev. ed. Zeehan, Tasmania : West Coast Pioneers' Memorial Museum, 1984.

External links
 Bureau of Meteorology

Mountains of Tasmania
Mount Read
Mount Read
Mount Read
Tasmanian forests
West Coast Range
Huon Pine